Broccoli City Festival is an American music festival founded by Greensboro, North Carolina entrepreneur Brandon McEachern.

History 
McEachern and longtime friend Marcus Allen hosted their first festival event in 2010, in Los Angeles, California to promote their clothing line and Earth Day.  Kendrick Lamar, Dom Kennedy, Casey Veggies, Skeme and more popular west coast artist performed. Broccoli City Festival was then founded in Washington, D.C. in 2013 after teaming up with Darryl Perkins and Jermon Williams, where Big K.R.I.T was the headliner. The festival moved to Washington, D.C. to promote environmental causes in the African-American community.

Rapper Jay-Z was interested in the festival, the year singer and sister-in-law Solange was the headliner.

Previous headliners have included Miguel, Migos, Cardi B, Cam'ron, Future, Jhené Aiko, BJ the Chicago Kid, The Internet, and Anderson .Paak. In 2019, rappers Childish Gambino and Lil Wayne, with performances by singers Ella Mai and Teyana Taylor, and rappers including City Girls, Trippie Redd, and Lil Baby performed at the festival, which was held at FedEx Field.

The 2022 Lineup included 21 Savage, Ari Lennox, Lil Durk, Summer Walker, Jeezy, Gunna, Wizkid and more. This year's festival coincides with the launch of BLK Change Weekend, which aims to create a more racially fair world for Black Millennials and Gen Z.

References 

2010 establishments in California
Music festivals in Washington, D.C.
2013 establishments in Washington, D.C.
Music festivals established in 2010
Hip hop music festivals in the United States